Jonathan James Irwin (born 18 November 1973) is an English television presenter, writer, lecturer, business and property expert.

Early life
Irwin grew up on a small farm in the village of Bitteswell, Leicestershire. Irwin was educated at Lutterworth Grammar School and Community College. He obtained a degree from Birmingham City University in estate management.

He is of Irish descent.

Career
Irwin worked for business transfer specialists Christie & Co, becoming an associate director within three years, before going on to work for Colliers International.

In 2004, Irwin was selected from hundreds of applicants along with co-presenter Jasmine Harman to present Channel 4's show A Place in the Sun – Home or Away, and has filmed over 200 episodes all around Britain. The programme is also broadcast daily on More4, Discovery Real Time and Discovery Travel & Living, as well as channels throughout Europe and the rest of the world, including New Zealand, Australia, and South Africa. In 2022 Irwin accused A Place in the Sun producers of axing him as presenter after 18 years due to a cancer diagnosis, leaving his mood “really low.” 

Irwin also presents episodes of BBC property shows Escape to the Country and To Buy or Not to Buy. Irwin has also presented the spin-off to Escape to the Country, Escape to the Perfect Town. 

In January 2011, Sky 1 broadcast Irwin's own show called Dream Lives for Sale, which saw him help people leave behind their lives in the UK and buy a business. In late 2011 he began a new series, The Renovation Game, which aired on weekday mornings on Channel 4.

Over the past ten years, Irwin has advised clients on business and property, ranging from small high street gift shops to multimillion pound corporate hotel packages. He still runs a property and business consultancy.

Irwin writes a regular column for A Place in the Sun magazine. He appears at A Place in the Sun Live giving presentations on his tips for buying property abroad. Irwin also regularly hosts seminars and corporate events.

Personal life
Irwin is a keen sportsman. He played rugby for Lutterworth RFC and then for Rugby Lions RFC, until an accident in a sevens tournament in which he broke his back and subsequently retired.

Irwin married Jessica Holmes in September 2016. Together they have three sons. Rex born 2018 and twin sons Rafa and Cormac born 2020. Irwin and his family moved to the Hertfordshire town of Berkhamsted in 2018 and then to the Newcastle upon Tyne area. 

Health and illness
On 13 November 2022, Irwin shared that he had terminal lung cancer, after being diagnosed in 2020. In an interview with Hello!'', Irwin said, "I don't know how long I have left, but I try to stay positive and my attitude is that I'm living with cancer, not dying from it. I set little markers – things I want to be around for [...] I'm doing everything I can to hold that day off for as long as possible. I owe that to Jess and our boys. Some people in my position have bucket lists, but I just want us to do as much as we can as a family."

References

External links
 Official A Place in the Sun website
 A Place in the Sun:Home or Away? on Channel 4 Television

1973 births
Alumni of Birmingham City University
English people of Irish descent
English television presenters
Living people
People from Lutterworth